Nag Hammadi Codex XIII (designated by siglum NHC XIII) is a papyrus codex with a collection of early Christian Gnostic texts in Coptic (Sahidic dialect). The manuscript is dated to the 4th century.

Description 
The manuscript was written on papyrus in the form of a codex. It is written in Sahidic dialect. The codex contains: Trimorphic Protennoia and On the Origin of the World. It is the only surviving copy of the Trimorphic Protennoia.

The text is written in uncial letters. It is well written in an informal book hand. There is no punctuation, no division between sayings. The nomina sacra are contracted in an unusual way (ΠΝΑ, ΧΣ, ΧΡΣ, ΙΗΣ), the words at the end of line are abbreviated. The scribe is identical with the scribe A of Codex II. The scribe employed several styles. The scribe made several errors of haplography (omitted letter N in 38.7; 48.28; omitted OY 40.18; omitted T in 48.15) and dittography (42.26; 45.31).

The so-called "Codex XIII" is in fact not a codex, but rather the text of Trimorphic Protennoia, written on "... eight leaves removed from a thirteenth book in late antiquity and tucked inside the front cover of the sixth." Only a few lines from the beginning of Origin of the World are discernible on the bottom of the eighth leaf.

It was buried with the other Nag Hammadi Codices, where it lay until the day of its discovery in 1945.

On June 8, 1952 the Coptic Museum received the codex. The text of the codex was edited by Gesine Schenke. It was examined and described by James J. Robinson in 1979. Currently the manuscript is housed at the Department of manuscripts of the Coptic Museum (Inv. 10545) in Cairo.

See also 
 Coptic manuscripts
 British Library Or 4926
 Nag Hammadi Codex II

 Greek manuscripts
 Papyrus Oxyrhynchus 1
 Papyrus Oxyrhynchus 654
 Papyrus Oxyrhynchus 655

References

Further reading 
 John D. Turner, Nag Hammadi Codex XIII, in: Elaine H. Pagels, Charles W. Hedrick, Nag Hammadi codices, XI, XII, XIII, BRILL, 1990, pp. 359–460.
 Bentley Layton, Nag Hammadi codex II, 2-7: together with XIII, 2*, Brit. Lib. Or.4926(1), and P.OXY. 1, 654, 655 : with contributions by many scholars, BRILL, 1989.
 Gesine Schenke, Die dreigestaltige protennoia (Nag-Hammadi-Codex XIII), Walter de Gruyter (1984).

External links 
 Nag Hammadi Archive
 Antiquities of the Institute for Antiquity and Christianity 
 NH Codex 11, 12 and 13 LDAB
 John D. Turner, TRIMORPHIC PROTENNOIA (XIII 35, 1 -50, 24)

Gnostic Gospels
4th-century manuscripts
Nag Hammadi library